The 2013 World Snooker Championship (officially the 2013 Betfair World Snooker Championship) was a professional snooker tournament that took place from 20 April to 6 May 2013 at the Crucible Theatre in Sheffield, England. It was the 37th consecutive year the Crucible had hosted the World Snooker Championship; the 2013 event was the last ranking tournament of the 2012–13 snooker season. Sports betting company Betfair sponsored the event for the first time.

Despite not having played a competitive match all season, defending champion Ronnie O'Sullivan did not lose one session in the tournament and defeated Barry Hawkins 18–12 in the final to become a five-time World Champion, joining Steve Davis and Stephen Hendry as the only players to have successfully defended their titles at the Crucible. O'Sullivan broke Hendry's record of 127 career centuries at the Crucible, finishing the tournament with 131, and also became the first player to make six century breaks in a World Championship final. Of the 55 century breaks made during the event, Neil Robertson made the highest , a 143, in his first-round loss to Robert Milkins.

Overview
The World Snooker Championship is an annual cue sport tournament and the official professional world championship of the game of snooker. Since 1977, the Crucible Theatre in Sheffield has hosted the event. During the tournament, 32 professional players compete in one-on-one snooker matches in a single elimination format, each of which is played over several . The event's 32-player lineup is selected using the snooker world rankings and a pre-tournament qualification round.  English player Ronnie O'Sullivan won the previous year's championship by defeating fellow countryman Ali Carter in the final 18–11. The winner of the 2013 event earned prize money of £250,000, from a pool of £1,111,000. Sports betting company Betfair sponsored the event for the first time in 2013.

Format

The 2013 World Snooker Championship was held between 20 April and 6 May 2013 in Sheffield, England. It was the last of 11 rankings events in the 2012–13 snooker season on the World Snooker Tour. The tournament featured a 32-player main draw that took place at the Crucible Theatre and a 92-player qualifying draw that was played on 6 and 11 April 2015 at the English Institute of Sport.  This was the 45th successive world championship to be contested using the knockout format after reverting from a challenge match system in the 1960s.

Ordinarily the top-16 players in the world rankings automatically qualified for the main draw as seeded players. Despite not playing a competitive event since the last world championship, Ronnie O'Sullivan was seeded first overall as the defending champion; the remaining 15 seeds were allocated using the latest world rankings, which were released after the China Open,  the penultimate event of the season. The number of frames needed to win a match increased with each round of the main draw, starting with best-of-19-frames matches in the first round and ending with the final, which was played as a best-of-35-frames match.

Prize fund
The event had a prize fund of £1,111,000, of which the winner received £250,000. A breakdown of prize money for 2013 is shown below:

 Winner: £250,000
 Runner-up: £125,000
 Semi-final: £52,000
 Quarter-final: £24,050
 Last 16: £16,000
 Last 32: £12,000
 Last 48: £8,200
 Last 64: £4,600
 Non-televised highest break: £1,000
 Televised highest break: £10,000
 Total: £1,111,000

Tournament summary

First round

The first round was played between 20 and 25 April 2013; matches were held as the best-of-19 frames over two . Players Jack Lisowski, Michael White, Ben Woollaston, Dechawat Poomjaeng, Matthew Selt and Sam Baird made their debuts at the main stages of the event. Poomjaeng was only the third player from Thailand, after James Wattana and Tai Pichit, to reach the event. Two of the debuting players progressed to the second round; Michael White advanced by defeating two-time champion Mark Williams 10–6, while Dechawat Poomjaeng advanced by beating Stephen Maguire 10–9.

Four Chinese players—a record for the event—had played in the 2012 competition but Ding Junhui was the only Chinese player to appear in 2013. Ding defeated Alan McManus 10–5 to reach the second round. Peter Ebdon was playing in his 22nd consecutive World Championship, equalling the number of consecutive appearances made by Steve Davis and putting him third for consecutive appearances behind Stephen Hendry on 27 and O'Sullivan on 26. In a repeat of the final of the 2006 event, Ebdon faced Graeme Dott; the match overran and was played over three sessions. Dott was ahead 8–6 after the second session and eventually won 10–6. The match lasted for more than seven hours; Ebdon had a high break of 37. Dott criticised Ebdon for his perceived slow play and called for a rule to limit the time a player could spend over a shot.

The ending of the match between defending champion Ronnie O'Sullivan and Marcus Campbell was not aired on the BBC, which instead broadcast a repeat episode of the 1970s sitcom Some Mothers Do 'Ave 'Em. The match was also unavailable on the BBC Red Button service, leading to viewers expressing their anger on social networks. The CEO of World Snooker Barry Hearn, apologised to fans on Twitter and wrote a formal letter of complaint to the BBC. O'Sullivan won the match 10–4; he had not played a competitive match since winning the title the year before. O'Sullivan said he wanted to "take some time off" and had refused to sign the player's contract for the following season.

Robert Milkins defeated the 2010 champion Neil Robertson 8–10. Robertson made the highest break of the event—a 143 in frame six—and led 5–2 but Milkins tied the match at 8–8 before winning the next two frames. In other matches, four-time champion John Higgins lost 6–10 to Mark Davis whilst former finalist Matthew Stevens lost 7–10 to qualifier Marco Fu.

Second round
The second round was played between 25 and 30 April as the best of 25 frames over three sessions. Shaun Murphy defeated Graeme Dott 13–11 after leading 6–2 after the first session. Dott's elimination meant there were no Scottish players in the last eight for the first time since 1988. Michael White reached his first ranking event quarter-final by defeating Poomjaeng 13–3 after two of the three scheduled sessions.

O'Sullivan became the first defending champion since Murphy in 2006 to reach the quarter-finals when he defeated Ali Carter, his opponent in the 2008 and 2012 World Championship finals, 13–8. Ricky Walden, in his first world championship second-round appearance, defeated Robert Milkins 13–11. Milkins trailed 3–9 but recovered to 10–11 and 11–12 but Walden won the frame he needed for victory. Barry Hawkins also reached his first Crucible quarter-final after defeating world number one Mark Selby 13–10.

Quarter-finals
The quarter-finals were played on 31 April and 1 May as best-of-25 frames matches over three sessions. In his match against Stuart Bingham, O'Sullivan won 11 of the first 12 frames and won the match 13–4 in the first frame of the third session. The final frame lasted 53 minutes and was won by Trump. Ricky Walden defeated Michael White 13–6 and Hawkins defeated Ding Junhui 13–7, eliminating the two remaining non-English competitors from the tournament. Walden reached the semi-finals of the World Championship on his third attempt, despite not having previously won a match in his earlier appearances in the main stages of the event in 2009 and 2011.

Semi-finals
The semi-finals were played between 2 and 4 May 2013 over four sessions as the best-of-33 frames. This was the third semi-finals round in the modern history of snooker in which all of the players were English. O'Sullivan played Judd Trump in the first semi-final; in the 23rd frame, O'Sullivan received a reprimand from referee Michaela Tabb for allegedly making an obscene gesture with his cue. A World Snooker spokesman later stated eyewitnesses had also observed O'Sullivan making an inappropriate gesture but it was not captured on camera. O'Sullivan defeated Trump 17–11 and became the first defending champion to reach the final since Ken Doherty in 1998. In the other semi-final, Barry Hawkins trailed Ricky Walden 8–12 but won nine of the next eleven frames to win 17–14.

Final

The 2013 final between Ronnie O'Sullivan and Barry Hawkins was played on 5 and 6 May as the best-of-35 frames over four sessions and officiated by Jan Verhaas. O'Sullivan led 5–3 after the first session; Hawkins drew level at 7–7 but O'Sullivan won the last three frames of the day to take a 10–7 overnight lead. O'Sullivan's break of 103 in the 15th frame was his 128th century break at the Crucible Theatre, breaking Stephen Hendry's record of 127 Crucible centuries, and he extended the record to 131 century breaks. O'Sullivan won the third session by five frames to three to lead 15–10. O'Sullivan went on to win the final 18–12 to take his fifth world title and become the first defending champion to retain his title since Hendry in 1996 and the first player to score six century breaks in a world championship final.

Eight century breaks were scored in the final, equalling the record set in the 2002 final between Hendry and Peter Ebdon. At the age of 37, O'Sullivan became the oldest World Snooker Champion since 45-year-old Ray Reardon in 1978. This was O'Sullivan's fifth world championship but he did not rule out a similar season away from the tour, saying; "I had my year out and enjoyed my year out. I intend to play in some small events. Come December or January I'll have a better idea of what I'm going to do." As world champion, O'Sullivan was awarded a wild card place at the 2014 Masters, which he also won.

Main draw
Shown below are the results for each round. The numbers in parentheses beside some of the players are their seeding ranks (each championship has 16 seeds and 16 qualifiers). The draw for the first round took place on 15 April 2013, one day after the qualifying, and was broadcast live by Talksport at 1:30 pm BST.

Qualifying

Preliminary qualifying
Four preliminary qualifying rounds for the tournament were for invited amateur players and members not on the Main Tour; they took place on 4 and 5 April 2013 at the World Snooker Academy in Sheffield. Names in bold denote match winners.

Round 1

Round 2

Round 3

Round 4

Main qualifying
The first three qualifying rounds for the tournament took place between 6 and 11 April 2013 at the English Institute of Sport in Sheffield,. The final round of qualifying took place between 13 and 14 April 2013 at the same venue.

Century breaks

Main stage centuries 
A total of 55 century breaks were made during the main stage of the World Championship. Neil Robertson, the player who compiled the highest break of the tournament, received a  made of gold.

 143  Neil Robertson
 142, 127, 118, 117, 112, 109, 104  Judd Trump
 140, 119, 113, 106, 105, 104  Ricky Walden
 133, 133, 125, 124, 113, 111, 106, 106, 105, 104, 103, 102, 100  Ronnie O'Sullivan
 133, 127, 114, 104, 100  Barry Hawkins
 131, 129, 114, 107, 104, 103  Ding Junhui
 128, 128, 112, 112, 106  Shaun Murphy
 117  Marco Fu
 111, 106  Stuart Bingham
 106, 104  Robert Milkins
 106  Ali Carter
 103  Mark Selby
 102, 101, 100  Michael White
 100  Graeme Dott
 100  Jack Lisowski

Qualifying stage centuries 
A total of 63 century breaks were made during the qualifying stage of the World Championship:

 142, 133, 113, 104  Sam Baird
 140, 122, 117, 100  Yu Delu
 139  Ryan Day
 138, 117, 100  Ben Woollaston
 138, 103  Matthew Selt
 137  Robin Hull
 136, 120, 104  Michael White
 131, 128, 114, 100  Jack Lisowski
 131, 102  Patrick Wallace
 131  Dominic Dale
 130  Jimmy White
 129  Thepchaiya Un-Nooh
 128  Ken Doherty
 128  Joe Perry
 124  Michael Wasley
 123, 121  Mike Dunn
 122  Anthony Hamilton
 117, 113, 101, 100  Kurt Maflin
 115, 103  Mark Davis
 115  Justin Astley
 114, 105, 102  Liam Highfield
 114, 101  Tony Drago
 112, 100  Joel Walker
 110, 109  Mark King
 108  Marco Fu
 106  Thanawat Thirapongpaiboon
 105, 100  Joe Swail
 105  Craig Steadman
 103  Alfie Burden
 103  Barry Pinches
 103  Daniel Wells
 103  Liang Wenbo
 102  Dave Gilbert
 102  Alan McManus
 102  Paul Wykes
 100  Pankaj Advani
 100  Cao Yupeng

References

External links
 
 2013 Betfair World Championship picture gallery at Facebook

2013
World Championship
World Championship
Sports competitions in Sheffield
World Championship
World Championship